The ETR 480 is a tilting Electric Multiple Unit built by Fiat Ferroviaria (now Alstom Ferroviaria) since 1993, It is also known as Pendolino. It was developed from the first new-generation Pendolino, the ETR 460.

FS Class 485 
The ETR 480 was originally built without real 25 kV AC electrical equipment. This equipment is now installed on all the sets and the trains that have been converted are then re-measured on ETR 485.

Export 
One of these units has been sent for testing on the Greek railway (TrainOSE), on the high speed line between Thessaloniki and Katerini. In August 2018, the specified number of 485,031 was transferred from Italy to Greece for test routes. This was the beginning for converting some ETR 470 for use by TrainOSE.

Technical information
max. speed (in service):  
traction system: = 3 kV DC, 25 kV 50 Hz AC (all 15 trainsets)
power: 
length:  
mass:  
max axle load:   
max. tilting angle: 8° 
configuration: head coach + 7 middle coaches + head coach
total number of seats: ETR 480: 480 (341 II + 139 I); ETR 485: 489 (343 ll + 146 l)

See also
 ElettroTreno
 Alfa Pendular
 List of high speed trains
 ETR 460
 ETR 470
 New Pendolino
 Renfe Class 104

References

External links

ETR 460 & ETR 480 Photos

High-speed trains of Italy
Pendolino
ETR 480
Fiat Ferroviaria
3000 V DC multiple units
25 kV AC multiple units
Alstom multiple units
Passenger trains running at least at 250 km/h in commercial operations